Heartbreakers is a 1984 American drama film starring Peter Coyote and Nick Mancuso. It was written and directed by Bobby Roth. The film was entered into the 35th Berlin International Film Festival.

Plot
Two friends in their mid 30s, Blue (Coyote) and Eli (Mancuso), each arrive at crossroads in their lives. Blue is a painter specializing in fetishistic portraits of women, usually selling his images to porn magazines. Eli's father wants him to take over the family's undergarment business that has been paying for Eli's playboy lifestyle in the fast-paced and decadent Los Angeles of the 1980s.

Blue is given an opportunity to have his work featured in gallery showing as legitimate art if he can create enough new pieces to fill out a show. His sexy busty model (Carol Wayne) has a crush on Blue, and to please him even appears willing to participate in a threesome including Eli.

An ex-flame, Cyd (Kathryn Harrold), brings out the jealous worst in Blue now that she is seeing an artist rival of his (Max Gail). Blue's self-destructive behavior also puts at risk his relationship with Liliane (Carole Laure), the manager of an art gallery about to exhibit his work.

Cast
 Peter Coyote as Arthur Blue
 Nick Mancuso as Eli
 Carole Laure as Liliane
 Max Gail as King
 James Laurenson as Terry Ray
 Carol Wayne as Candy
 Jamie Rose as Libby
 Kathryn Harrold as Cyd
 George Morfogen as Max
 Jerry Hardin as Warren Williams
 Henry G. Sanders as Reuben (as Henry Sanders)
 Walter Olkewicz as Marvin

Production
The character of Blue was loosely based on real-life artist Robert Blue.

Behind the Scenes
This would be Carol Wayne's final film appearance before she died under mysterious circumstances on vacation in Manzanillo, Mexico just months after the film's release.

Soundtrack

Heartbreakers (1985) is the twenty-fifth major release and seventh soundtrack album by the German band Tangerine Dream. It was released in April 1985 by Virgin Records.

Track listing

Personnel
 Edgar Froese – keyboards, electronic equipment, guitar
 Christopher Franke – synthesizers, electronic equipment, electronic percussion
 Johannes Schmoelling – keyboards, electronic equipment

References

External links
 
 
 

1984 films
1980s buddy drama films
1984 drama films
American buddy drama films
1980s English-language films
Films about fictional painters
Films directed by Bobby Roth
Films scored by Tangerine Dream
1980s American films